Mahmud Anjum Asrar (born November 20, 1976 in Ankara, Turkey) is a Turkish comic book artist who is known for his work on American and non-American comic books.

His American work includes pinups for Savage Dragon #124 and Invincible #20, and for co-creating, with writer Jay Faerber, the series Dynamo 5, which debuted in March 2007 from Image Comics.

Early life
Asrar was born in Ankara, Turkey to an Austrian mother and a Pakistani father. He expressed an interest in art and comic books at an early age.

He attended Hacettepe University from 1994–1996, majoring in Fine Arts and Graphics, and Anatolian University from 1996–2000, majoring in the same.

Career
Asrar came to the attention of writer Jay Faerber through his work on the independent anthology Digital Webbing Presents, and through a recommendation by Invincible artist Ryan Ottley, which led to his work on the Image Comics monthly series Dynamo 5, which Faerber and Asrar co-created, and on which Asrar was the regular artist. Asrar's other Image Comics work includes Small Gods.

Asrar also pencilled She-Hulk: Cosmic Collision, a one-shot written by Peter David, that was published in December 2008, by Marvel Comics. He was the artist on the Brightest Day: Atom oneshot written by Jeff Lemire that leads into an Atom co-feature in Adventure Comics, and is currently the artist of Supergirl in the rebooted DC Universe. Starting in March 2013, Asrar was the lead artist on Ultimate Comics: X-Men.

Bibliography

DC
Adventure Comics (Atom) #516-521 (2010–11)
Atom (Ray Palmer) Giant-Size #1 (2011)
Brightest Day: The Atom Special #1 (2011)
Justice League of America, vol. 4, 80-Page Giant #1 (among other artists, 2009)
Supergirl, vol. 6, #0-7, 9-12, 14-17, 19-20 (2011–13)
Batman vs Robin #1-5 (2022-2023)

Image
Dynamo 5 #0-25 (2007–09)
Invincible #20 (2005)
Savage Dragon #124 (along with Erik Larsen) (2006)
Small Gods: Outside The Box, miniseries, #1-4 (2004)

Marvel
All-New X-Men #20, #31-36, #40-41 (2014-2015)
Avengers: The Initiative #32 (2010)
Nova, vol. 3, #34-35 (full art); Annual #1 (among other artists) (2008–10)
Realm of Kings, miniseries, #1 (2010)
She-Hulk: Cosmic Collision (2009)
Young Avengers: Siege (2010)
Thunderbolts #137 (2009)
X-Men #24-25 (2013)
War of Kings: Warriors, miniseries, #1 (2009)
War Machine, vol. 3, #6-7 (2009)
Wolverine and the X-Men, vol. 2, #1-6 (2014)
X-Men Red (2018)
Uncanny X-Men (2018-2019)

Other publishers
Alacakaranlik #2 (2006)
Cyberage Adventures #2: "Jade Tiger" (2005, IHero Entertainment)
Digital Webbing Presents #20, 25-26 (Digital Webbing Press, 2004–05)
Dylan Dog #9 (Rodeo Kitap, 2004)
Nothingface, graphic novel (Digital Webbing Press, 2004)
Resimli Roman #2-3 (2005)
Rodeo Strip #1-6, 11 (Rodeo Kitap, 2004–06)
Star Wars: Jedi The Dark Side, miniseries #1-5 (2011)
Seruven #6 (2005)
Warmageddon Quarterly #2-3 (2006, L Jamal Inc)

References

External links

1976 births
Living people
Turkish comics artists
Turkish people of Pakistani descent
Turkish people of Austrian descent